Arnold Shultz (1886–1931) was an American fiddler and guitarist who is noted as a major influence in the development of the "thumb-style," or "Travis picking" method of playing guitar.

Biography 
Shultz, the son of a former slave, was born into a family of touring musicians in Ohio County, Kentucky, in 1886. In 1900, Shultz began studying guitar under his uncle, developing a jazzy "thumb-style" method of playing guitar that eventually evolved into the Kentucky style for which such musicians as Chet Atkins, Doc Watson and Merle Travis would be known. Professionally, Shultz was a laborer, traveling from Kentucky through Mississippi and New Orleans, working with coal or as a deck hand.

In the early 1920s, he played fiddle in the otherwise white hillbilly and Dixieland band of Forest "Boots" Faught. To the occasional complaints this brought (objections like "You've got a colored fiddle. We don't want that!"), Faught would simply reply, "I've got the man because he's a good musician." Shultz also played with Charlie Monroe and gave Bill Monroe the opportunity to play his first paid musical gig, joining together at a square dance with Shultz playing fiddle and Monroe on guitar.

Influence 
Though he was not recorded, his blues playing made a powerful influence. Bill Monroe, who was formative in the development of bluegrass music, has openly cited Shultz as an influence on his playing, and Shultz taught his guitar methods to Kennedy Jones, who disseminated the "thumb-style" methods further. His methods were passed down further to Merle Travis and Ike Everly.

Schultz died on April 14, 1931 of a heart problem, a mitral lesion, though legends have persisted that he died as a result of poisoning by a white musician who was jealous of him. Less colorful reports indicate that he suffered a stroke while boarding a bus. Arnold Schultz died in Butler County, Kentucky, near the small city of Morgantown. He is buried in the town's only African American cemetery at the end of Bell Street.

References

Sources

External links
 Photo of Arnold Schultz (left) and Clarence Wilson (right).

1886 births
1931 deaths
American blues guitarists
American street performers
American fiddlers
American folk guitarists
American male guitarists
Country blues musicians
Blues musicians from Kentucky
People from Ohio County, Kentucky
Folk musicians from Kentucky
Guitarists from Kentucky
20th-century guitarists
20th-century American violinists
20th-century American male musicians